The 73rd parallel north is a circle of latitude that is 73 degrees north of the Earth's equatorial plane, in the Arctic. It crosses the Atlantic Ocean, Europe, Asia, the Arctic Ocean and North America.

At this latitude the sun is visible for 24 hours, 0 minutes during the summer solstice and nautical twilight during the winter solstice.

Around the world
Starting at the Prime Meridian and heading eastwards, the parallel 73° north passes through:

{| class="wikitable plainrowheaders"
! scope="col" width="125" | Co-ordinates
! scope="col" | Country, territory or sea
! scope="col" | Notes
|-valign="top"
| style="background:#b0e0e6;" | 
! scope="row" style="background:#b0e0e6;" | Atlantic Ocean
| style="background:#b0e0e6;" | Greenland Sea Norwegian Sea
|-
| style="background:#b0e0e6;" | 
! scope="row" style="background:#b0e0e6;" | Barents Sea
| style="background:#b0e0e6;" |
|-
| 
! scope="row" | 
| Novaya Zemlya - Yuzhny Island
|-
| style="background:#b0e0e6;" | 
! scope="row" style="background:#b0e0e6;" | Kara Sea
| style="background:#b0e0e6;" |
|-
| 
! scope="row" | 
| Southernmost point of Bely Island
|-
| style="background:#b0e0e6;" | 
! scope="row" style="background:#b0e0e6;" | Kara Sea
| style="background:#b0e0e6;" | Malygina Strait
|-
| 
! scope="row" | 
| Shokalsky Island
|-
| style="background:#b0e0e6;" | 
! scope="row" style="background:#b0e0e6;" | Kara Sea
| style="background:#b0e0e6;" | Passing just south of Neupokoyeva Island, 
|-
| 
! scope="row" | 
| Sibiryakov Island
|-
| style="background:#b0e0e6;" | 
! scope="row" style="background:#b0e0e6;" | Kara Sea
| style="background:#b0e0e6;" |
|-
| 
! scope="row" | 
|
|-
| style="background:#b0e0e6;" | 
! scope="row" style="background:#b0e0e6;" | Laptev Sea
| style="background:#b0e0e6;" | Olenyok Gulf
|-
| 
! scope="row" | 
| Lena delta
|-
| style="background:#b0e0e6;" | 
! scope="row" style="background:#b0e0e6;" | Laptev Sea
| style="background:#b0e0e6;" |
|-
| style="background:#b0e0e6;" | 
! scope="row" style="background:#b0e0e6;" | East Siberian Sea
| style="background:#b0e0e6;" | Passing just south of Great Lyakhovsky Island, 
|-
| style="background:#b0e0e6;" | 
! scope="row" style="background:#b0e0e6;" | Arctic Ocean
| style="background:#b0e0e6;" |
|-
| style="background:#b0e0e6;" | 
! scope="row" style="background:#b0e0e6;" | Beaufort Sea
| style="background:#b0e0e6;" |
|-
| 
! scope="row" | 
| Northwest Territories - Banks Island
|-
| style="background:#b0e0e6;" | 
! scope="row" style="background:#b0e0e6;" | Prince of Wales Strait
| style="background:#b0e0e6;" |
|-
| 
! scope="row" | 
| Northwest Territories - Victoria Island
|-
| style="background:#b0e0e6;" | 
! scope="row" style="background:#b0e0e6;" | Richard Collinson Inlet
| style="background:#b0e0e6;" |
|-
| 
! scope="row" | 
| Northwest Territories - Victoria Island
|-
| style="background:#b0e0e6;" | 
! scope="row" style="background:#b0e0e6;" | Wynniatt Bay
| style="background:#b0e0e6;" |
|-
| 
! scope="row" | 
| Northwest Territories - Victoria Island
|-
| style="background:#b0e0e6;" | 
! scope="row" style="background:#b0e0e6;" | Hadley Bay
| style="background:#b0e0e6;" |
|-
| 
! scope="row" | 
| Nunavut - Victoria Island and Stefansson Island 
|-
| style="background:#b0e0e6;" | 
! scope="row" style="background:#b0e0e6;" | M'Clintock Channel
| style="background:#b0e0e6;" |
|-
| 
! scope="row" | 
| Nunavut - Prince of Wales Island
|-
| style="background:#b0e0e6;" | 
! scope="row" style="background:#b0e0e6;" | Ommanney Bay
| style="background:#b0e0e6;" |
|-
| 
! scope="row" | 
| Nunavut - Prince of Wales Island and Prescott Island
|-
| style="background:#b0e0e6;" | 
! scope="row" style="background:#b0e0e6;" | Peel Sound
| style="background:#b0e0e6;" |
|-
| 
! scope="row" | 
| Nunavut - Somerset Island
|-
| style="background:#b0e0e6;" | 
! scope="row" style="background:#b0e0e6;" | Prince Regent Inlet
| style="background:#b0e0e6;" |
|-
| 
! scope="row" | 
| Nunavut - Baffin Island
|-
| style="background:#b0e0e6;" | 
! scope="row" style="background:#b0e0e6;" | Admiralty Inlet
| style="background:#b0e0e6;" |
|-
| 
! scope="row" | 
| Nunavut - Baffin Island
|-
| style="background:#b0e0e6;" | 
! scope="row" style="background:#b0e0e6;" | Navy Board Inlet
| style="background:#b0e0e6;" |
|-
| 
! scope="row" | 
| Nunavut - Bylot Island
|-
| style="background:#b0e0e6;" | 
! scope="row" style="background:#b0e0e6;" | Baffin Bay
| style="background:#b0e0e6;" |
|-
| 
! scope="row" | 
| Puugutaa
|-
| 
! scope="row" | 
| Geographical Society Island
|-valign="top"
| style="background:#b0e0e6;" | 
! scope="row" style="background:#b0e0e6;" | Atlantic Ocean
| style="background:#b0e0e6;" | Greenland Sea Norwegian Sea
|-
|}

Greenland
Between 1776 and 1950, the 73rd parallel formed the northern limit of the Royal Greenland Trade Department's exclusive monopoly on trade near the Dano-Norwegian and later Danish colonies of Greenland (1776–1782) and North Greenland (1782–1950).

See also
72nd parallel north
74th parallel north

References

n73
Geography of the Arctic